Major-General Baptist Barton Crozier,  (17 July 1878 – 18 July 1957) was a British Army officer.

Military career
Crozier was commissioned into the Royal Artillery on 22 December 1898 and saw action during the Second Boer War and then the First World War. He fought at Givenchy on the Western Front for which he was appointed a Companion of the Distinguished Service Order. He then saw action in Italy for which he was appointed a Companion of the Order of St Michael and St George.

He went on to be Commander, Royal Artillery for Eastern Command in February 1929 and General Officer Commanding 43rd (Wessex) Infantry Division in October 1934 before retiring in December 1938.

References

1878 births
1957 deaths
British Army major generals
Companions of the Order of St Michael and St George
Companions of the Distinguished Service Order
Royal Artillery officers
British Army personnel of World War I
British Army personnel of the Second Boer War